Death Race 2000 is a 1975 American science fiction action film
produced by Roger Corman, directed by Paul Bartel, and starring David Carradine. The film takes place in a dystopian American society in the year 2000, where the murderous Transcontinental Road Race has become a form of national entertainment. The screenplay is based on the short story The Racer by Ib Melchior.

Plot
After the "World Crash of '79", massive civil unrest and economic ruin occurs. The United States government is restructured into a totalitarian regime under martial law. To pacify the population, the government has created the Transcontinental Road Race, where a group of drivers race across the country in their high-powered cars and which is infamous for violence, gore, and innocent pedestrians being struck and killed for bonus points. In the year 2000, the five drivers in the 20th annual race, who all adhere to professional wrestling-style personas and drive appropriately themed cars, include Frankenstein, the mysterious black-garbed champion and national hero; Machine Gun Joe Viterbo, a Chicago tough guy gangster; Calamity Jane, a cowgirl; Matilda the Hun, a Neo-Nazi; and Nero the Hero, a Roman gladiator. Machine Gun Joe Viterbo, the second-place champion, is the most determined of all to defeat Frankenstein and win the race.

A resistance group led by Thomasina Paine, a descendant of the 1770s American Revolutionary War hero Thomas Paine, plans to rebel against the regime, currently led by a man known only as Mr. President, by sabotaging the race, killing most of the drivers, and taking Frankenstein hostage as leverage against Mr. President. The group is assisted by Paine's great-granddaughter Annie Smith, Frankenstein's navigator. She plans to lure him into an ambush in order to have him replaced by a double. Despite a pirated national broadcast made by Ms. Paine herself, the Resistance's disruption of the race is covered up by the government and instead blamed on the French, who are also blamed for ruining the country's economy and telephone system. At first, the Resistance's plan seems to bear fruit: Nero the Hero is killed when a "baby" he runs over for points turns out to be a bomb, Matilda the Hun drives off a cliff while following a fake detour route set up by the Resistance, and Calamity Jane, who witnessed Matilda the Hun's death, inadvertently drives over a land mine. This leaves only Frankenstein and Machine Gun Joe Viterbo in the race. As Frankenstein nonchalantly survives every attempt made on his life during the race, Annie comes to discover that Frankenstein's mask and disfigured face are merely a disguise; he is, in fact, one of a number of random wards of the state who are trained exclusively to race under that identity, and each time they die or are brutally mutilated, they are secretly replaced so that Frankenstein appears to be indestructible.

The current Frankenstein reveals to Annie his own plan to kill Mr. President: when he wins the race and shakes hands with Mr. President, he will detonate a grenade which has been implanted in his prosthetic right hand. However, the plan goes awry when Machine Gun Joe Viterbo attacks Frankenstein and Annie is forced to kill him using Frankenstein's "hand grenade". Having successfully outmaneuvered both the rival drivers and the Resistance, Frankenstein is declared the winner of the race, although he is wounded and unable to carry out his original "hand grenade" attack plan. Annie instead dons Frankenstein's costume and plans to stab Mr. President while standing in for him on the podium. Before she is able to do so, Thomasina shoots "Frankenstein", convinced that he killed Annie. The real Frankenstein takes advantage of the confusion and rams Mr. President's stage with his car, finally fulfilling his lifelong desire to kill him. Frankenstein becomes the new president, marries Annie and appoints Thomasina as the Minister of Domestic Security to rebuild the state and dissolve the dictatorship. Junior Bruce, the announcer of the Transcontinental Road Race, opposes the race's abolition and impertinently claims that the public needs performances of violence. Annoyed by his complaints, Frankenstein hits Bruce with his car and drives off with Annie to the cheers and applause of the crowd.

Cast

 David Carradine as "Frankenstein"
 Simone Griffeth as Annie Smith (Frankenstein's navigator)
 Sylvester Stallone as Joe "Machine Gun" Viterbo 
 Mary Woronov as Jane "Calamity Jane" Kelly
 Roberta Collins as Matilda "The Hun"
 Martin Kove as Ray "Nero the Hero" Lonagan
 Louisa Moritz as Myra (Joe's navigator)
 Don Steele as Junior Bruce (race announcer)
 Joyce Jameson as Grace Pander (race announcer)
 Carle Bensen as Harold (race announcer)
 Sandy McCallum as Mr. President
 Paul Laurence as Special Agent
 Harriet Medin as Thomasina Paine
 Vince Trankina as Lieutenant Fury
 Bill Morey as Deacon
 Fred Grandy as Herman 'The German' Boch (Matilda's navigator)
 William Shephard as Pete (Jane's navigator)
 Leslie McRay as Cleopatra (Nero's navigator)
 Wendy Bartel as Laurie
 Jack Favorite as Henry
 Sandy Ignon as FBI Agent
 John Landis as Mechanic
 Darla McDonell as Rhonda Bainbridge
 Roger Rook as Radio Operator
 Wendy Dio as Blonde Masseuse

Production

Development and writing
Roger Corman wanted to make a futuristic action sports film to take advantage of the advance publicity of Rollerball (1975). He optioned a short story by Ib Melchior and hired Robert Thom to adapt it. Director Paul Bartel felt this was unshootable, so Charles B. Griffith rewrote it. Corman wanted Peter Fonda to play the lead, but he read the script and said it was too ridiculous to make, so David Carradine was cast instead; Carradine wanted to take on a role that would make people think of him as more than just Caine on Kung Fu and give him a leg up on a movie career. Carradine was paid 10% of the film's gross.

Bartel later recalled "We had terrible script problems; David had to finish his Kung Fu series before starting and we had bad weather. We all worked under terrible pressure. Roger and I had an essential disagreement over comedy. He took out a lot of the comedy scenes. He may have been right and was probably more objective."

In a 1982 interview, Bartel said, "Most of my guilty pleasures in this film were ripped out by the roots by Roger Corman before the film ever saw the light of day and substituted with crushed heads and blood squibs. Nevertheless, there is a joke about the French wrecking our economy and telephone system that I still find amusing. And I am pleased by the scene introducing the Girl Fan (played very effectively by my sister Wendy) who is to sacrifice herself beneath the wheels of David Carradine's race car and wants to meet him so that the gesture will have 'meaning'."

Release

Home media
Shout! Factory released a Deluxe Edition DVD and Blu-ray on June 22, 2010, in Region 1/A.

Previous video editions were released on VHS and DVD by Buena Vista Home Entertainment and New Concorde, among other studios.

Reception

Box office
According to Variety, the film earned $4.8 million in rentals in the United States.

Critical response
Contemporary reviews were mixed. Lawrence Van Gelder of The New York Times wrote that the film had "nothing to say beyond the superficial about government or rebellion. And in the absence of such a statement, it becomes what it seems to have mocked—a spectacle glorifying the car as an instrument of violence." Variety called the film "cartoonish but effective entertainment, with some good action sequences and plenty of black humor." Richard Combs of The Monthly Film Bulletin wrote that the comic conceits were "too shaky to hold the movie together and tend to self-destruct some distance short of any pop allegory for America." Gene Siskel of the Chicago Tribune gave the film one star out of four and wrote that it "may be the goofiest and sleaziest film I've seen in the last five years." Tom Shales of The Washington Post praised the film as "one of the zippier little B pictures of the year," adding that "it is designed primarily as a spectacle of kinetic titillation, and on that level, it's a foregone smash hit." Kevin Thomas of the Los Angeles Times was also positive, calling it "a fine little action picture with big ideas" and finding Carradine "terrific" in his role. In a February 2021 retrospective review, James Berardinelli gave the film 1 star out of 4; he said that it was similar to present-day releases by Blumhouse in that Roger Corman also made a lot of those types of low-budget horror/exploitation films and some were/are good but most aren't, and simply summed up the 1975 film by calling it "bad."

Roger Ebert gave the film zero stars in his review, deriding its violence and lamenting its appeal to small children. However, during a review of The Fast and the Furious on Ebert & Roeper and the Movies, Ebert named Death Race 2000 as part of a "great tradition of summer drive-in movies" that embrace a "summer exploitation mentality in a clever way". While Ebert hinted that he did not find the film as awful decades later as he did in 1975, he made it plain he would not alter or disavow his original zero-stars rating for it either. He also gave a scathing review of the 2008 sort-of-remake Death Race.

The film has garnered critical acclaim over the years, having a score of 81% on Rotten Tomatoes based on 37 reviews, with an average rating of 6.7/10, deeming it "fresh". The site's critical consensus states, "Death Race 2000 is a fun, campy classic, drawing genuine thrills from its mindless ultra-violence."

The film has long been regarded as a cult hit and was often viewed as superior to Rollerball, a much more expensive major studio drama released later in the same year; another dystopian science-fiction sports film similarly focusing on the use of dangerous sports as an "opiate" for the masses.

Year-end lists
The film is recognized by American Film Institute in these lists:
 2001: AFI's 100 Years...100 Thrills – Nominated

Other media

Video games
The 1982 video game Maze Death Race for ZX81 computers (and 1983 for ZX Spectrum) resembles the film by its cover artwork, title, and car-driving content.

The Carmageddon video game series borrows heavily from the plot, characters and car designs from the film Death Race 2000. The original game was supposed to be a game based on the comic series in the 1990s, but the plans were later changed.

Comic books
A comic book sequel series titled Death Race 2020 was published in April–November 1995 by Roger Corman's short-lived Roger Corman's Cosmic Comics imprint. It was written by Pat Mills of 2000 AD fame, with art by Kevin O'Neill (and additional art by Trevor Goring). Mills and O'Neill had already worked together on several comics, including Marshal Law. The comic book series, as the title indicates, takes place 20 years after the film ended and deals with Frankenstein's return to the race. New racers introduced here included Von Dutch, the Alcoholic, Happy the Clown, Steppenwolf, Rick Rhesus, and Harry Carrie.

The comic book series lasted eight issues before being canceled and the story was left unfinished at the end.

Remake series
Paul W. S. Anderson directed a remake entitled Death Race, which was released August 22, 2008, starring Jason Statham. The remake began production in late August 2007. Besides Statham, this new version also stars Ian McShane, Joan Allen, and Tyrese Gibson. It also includes a cameo (by voice-over) of David Carradine, reprising his role of Frankenstein. Two direct-to-DVD prequels, titled Death Race 2 (2010) and Death Race 3: Inferno (2013), starring Luke Goss, Tanit Phoenix, Danny Trejo and Ving Rhames, and a direct-to-DVD sequel, titled Death Race: Beyond Anarchy (2018), were also produced.

Sequel

An official sequel film to the original film, Death Race 2050, was produced by Roger Corman and released in early 2017.

In popular culture
 At the beginning of the song "Isle of Dead" by Buckethead, a short excerpt from the film can be heard.
 In the 1992 Roger Corman-produced film Munchie Strikes Back, clips from the film (including the helicopter chase) are used as part of a video game called Death Race 2000.
 The Alex Jones Show frequently uses the audio of the scene where Harold explains the scoring system as a bumper. The program also airs similar bumpers, which feature clips from other dystopian films such as Soylent Green and They Live.
The intro to the song "In The Last Second" by Jumpsteady features clips from Machine Gun Joe's first kill in the film.

See also
 List of American films of 1975
 Blood Drive

References

External links

Death Race (franchise)
1975 films
1970s action adventure films
1970s dystopian films
1970s road movies
1970s science fiction action films
American independent films
American road movies
American satirical films
American comedy films
American splatter films
American science fiction action films
1970s English-language films
Films directed by Paul Bartel
Films produced by Roger Corman
Films scored by Paul Chihara
Films with screenplays by Charles B. Griffith
Films based on science fiction short stories
American dystopian films
Films set in 2000
Films set in the future
New World Pictures films
Fictional motorsports
Motorsports in fiction
Politics in fiction
Sports fiction
1975 independent films
American action adventure films
American exploitation films
1970s American films